The 1946 Little All-America college football team is composed of college football players from small colleges and universities who were selected by the Associated Press (AP) as the best players at each position. For 1946, the AP selected first, second, and third teams.

First team
Back - Gene Roberts, Chattanooga
Back - Rudy Mobley, Hardin-Simmons
Back - Phil Colella, St. Bonaventure
Back - Hank Caver, Presbyterian
End - George Bibighaus, Muhlenberg
End - Marvin Goodman, Willamette
Tackle - Robert Hawkins, Evansville
Tackle - Tony Stalloni, Delaware
Guard - Mike Reed, Louisiana Tech
Guard - Bert Vanderclute, Wesleyan
Center - Cliff Rothrock, North Dakota Agricultural

Second team
Back - Larry Bruno, Geneva
Back - Darwin Horne, Pepperdine
Back - Ray Ramsey, Bradley Tech
Back - Joe Lustic, Morehead Teachers 
End - Harry Dickson, Idaho Southern
End - Ted Chittwood, Missouri Valley
Tackle - Nelson Schofield, Newberry
Tackle - Ray Yagiello, Catawba
Guard - Victor Pederson, Gustavus Adolphus
Guard - John Zollo, Maine
Center - Don Anderson, Southeast State (Cape Girardeau)

Third team
Back - Andy Victory, Oklahoma City
Back - Gerald Doherty, Delaware
Back - A.L. Camarata, Iowa Teachers
Back - Arthur Pollard, Arizona
End - Jack Coleman, Louisville
Ende - Mel Harms, Upper Iowa
Tackle - Ralph Hollywood, Austin
Tackle - Bo Stewart, Chattanooga
Guard - Frank Burke, New Mexico A&M
Guard - Dwaine Lyon, West Texas
Center - Norman Parent, Bates

See also
 1946 College Football All-America Team

References

Little All-America college football team
Little All-America college football teams